You Are I AM is a Christian worship music album by Darrell Evans released by Vertical Music in 1997.

Track listing 
"Whom Shall I Fear" [Psalm 27] - (Darrell Evans) - 5:23
"I Want to Know You" (Evans) - 5:23
"My God Reigns" (Evans) - 4:48
"We Will Embrace Your Move" [Isaiah 43:19; Psalm 100:5] - (Evans) - 5:53
"You Are I Am" (Evans) - 4:13
"New Song Arisin'" (Evans) - 3:43
"Let the River Flow" [Ezekiel 47] - (Evans) - 5:32
"I Surrender" (Evans and Scott Griffith) - 4:59
"I Am Yours" (Evans) - 6:00
"Take Me Away with You" (Evans) - 5:56

Personnel 
 Darrell Evans – lead vocals, acoustic guitar
 Chris Springer – keyboards (1, 2)
 Scott Griffith – keyboards (3-10)
 Glenn Pearce – electric guitars (1, 2)
 Todd Davidson – electric guitars (3-10)
 David Massey – electric guitars (3-10)
 Gary Lunn – bass (1, 2)
 Matt Jones – bass (3-10)
 Carl Albrecht – drums (1, 2)
 Scott French – drums (3-10)
 Gyle Smith – drums (3-10)
 Alex Acuña – percussion (1, 2)
 Matt Steele – percussion (3-10)
 Leann Albrecht – backing vocals (1, 2)
 Tom Lane – backing vocals (1, 2)
 Paul Smith – backing vocals (1, 2)
 Kelly Willard – backing vocals (1, 2)
 Preston Bostwick – backing vocals (3-10)
 Gayla Evans – backing vocals (3-10)
 Heidi French – backing vocals (3-10)
 Denise Johnson – backing vocals (3-10)
 Chris Rodriguez – backing vocals (3-10)
 Nicol Smith – backing vocals (3-10)

Production 
 Don Moen – executive producer 
 Chris Thomason – executive producer
 Chris Springer – A&R
 Don Harris – producer (1, 2), arrangements (1, 2)
 Paul Mills – producer (3-10), arrangements (3-10), recording (3-10), mixing (3-10)
 Eric Elwell – recording (1, 2)
 Matt Damico – assistant engineer (1, 2)
 Jeff Pitzer – assistant engineer (3-10)

1997 albums
Darrell Evans (musician) albums